Wilfredo Moreno (born 19 April 1976) is a Venezuelan footballer. He played in eleven matches for the Venezuela national football team from 2002 to 2004. He was also part of Venezuela's squad for the 2004 Copa América tournament.

References

External links
 

1976 births
Living people
Venezuelan footballers
Venezuela international footballers
Association football forwards
People from Ciudad Guayana
Deportivo Miranda F.C. managers